Lansing is a census-designated place in northern Pease Township, Belmont County, Ohio, United States, along Wheeling Creek. As of the 2010 census it had a population of 634. It has a post office with the ZIP code 43934.

Lansing is part of the Wheeling, WV-OH Metropolitan Statistical Area.

A post office called Lansing has been in operation since 1898. Besides the post office, Lansing had a church, built there in 1834. 
Lansing was once known as Soaptown.

References

Census-designated places in Belmont County, Ohio
1898 establishments in Ohio